Elk Lick is an extinct town in Clermont County, in the U.S. state of Ohio. The GNIS classifies it as a populated place.

History
Elk Lick was named for a mineral lick of the same name.

References

Unincorporated communities in Clermont County, Ohio
Unincorporated communities in Ohio